The 1979–80 Segunda División was the 31st season of the Mexican Segunda División. The season started on 14 July 1979 and concluded on 22 June 1980. It was won by Atletas Campesinos.

Changes 
 Atlas was promoted to Primera División.
 Veracruz was relegated from Primera División.
 Lobos de Tlaxcala, SUOO and Cachorros León were promoted from Tercera División.
 Morelos was relegated from Segunda División.
 Nacional was bought by new owners, the team was relocated to Tulancingo and renamed as Titanes de Tulancingo.
 UV Córdoba was moved to Xalapa and renamed as Universidad Veracruzana.

Teams

Group stage

Group 1

Group 2

Group 3

Group 4

Results

Final stage

Group 1

Group 2

Final

References 

1979–80 in Mexican football
Segunda División de México seasons